In enzymology, a Delta1-piperideine-2-carboxylate reductase is an enzyme that catalyzes the chemical reaction

L-pipecolate + NADP+  Delta1-piperideine-2-carboxylate + NADPH + H+

Thus, the two substrates of this enzyme are L-pipecolate and NADP+, whereas its 3 products are Delta1-piperideine-2-carboxylate, NADPH, and H+.

This enzyme belongs to the family of oxidoreductases, specifically those acting on the CH-NH group of donors with NAD+ or NADP+ as acceptor.  The systematic name of this enzyme class is L-pipecolate:NADP+ 2-oxidoreductase. Other names in common use include 1,2-didehydropipecolate reductase, P2C reductase, and 1,2-didehydropipecolic reductase.  This enzyme participates in lysine degradation.

References

 

EC 1.5.1
NADPH-dependent enzymes
Enzymes of unknown structure